Manish Khanna is an Indian television actor.

Television

References

External links
 

Year of birth missing (living people)
Living people
Indian television actors
Actors from New Delhi